82 may refer to: 
 82 (number)
 one of the years 82 BC, AD 82, 1982, 2082
 82 (album), a studio album by Kenyan electronic music band Just a Band

See also
 
 Lead, chemical element with atomic number 82
 List of highways numbered